The canton of Maîche is an administrative division of the Doubs department, eastern France. Its borders were modified at the French canton reorganisation which came into effect in March 2015. Its seat is in Maîche.

It consists of the following communes:
 
Abbévillers
Autechaux-Roide
Belfays
Bief
Blamont
Bondeval
Les Bréseux
Burnevillers
Cernay-l'Église
Chamesol
Charmauvillers
Charquemont
Courtefontaine
Dampjoux
Damprichard
Dannemarie
Les Écorces
Écurcey
Ferrières-le-Lac
Fessevillers
Fleurey
Fournet-Blancheroche
Frambouhans
Froidevaux
Glay
Glère
Goumois
Indevillers
Liebvillers
Maîche
Mancenans-Lizerne
Meslières
Montancy
Montandon
Mont-de-Vougney
Montécheroux
Montjoie-le-Château
Orgeans-Blanchefontaine
Pierrefontaine-lès-Blamont
Les Plains-et-Grands-Essarts
Roches-lès-Blamont
Saint-Hippolyte
Soulce-Cernay
Les Terres-de-Chaux
Thiébouhans
Thulay
Trévillers
Urtière
Valoreille
Vaufrey
Villars-lès-Blamont

References

Cantons of Doubs